Albert Schreiner (7 August 1892 in Aglasterhausen – 4 August 1979 in Berlin) was a German political activist and Marxist historian.

Life 
The son of an SPD functionary, he became an SPD member in 1910, where he belonged to the party's left wing. In the First World War he was in the Spartacus League and subsequently was a founding member of the KPD. He played a significant role at Stuttgart during the November Revolution. On 9 November 1918 he became Minister of War for the first revolutionary government of the Free People's State of Württemberg. Since the Spartacus League in Stuttgart under the leadership of Fritz Rück and August Thalheimer refused to take part in the government, Schreiner withdrew from the Blos Cabinet on 15 November.

Until 1922 he was a paid functionary of the KPD in Württemberg. At the Fourth World Congress of Komintern he participated as a delegate. In 1923 he worked in the military wing of the KDP and was then M-Leader of the Wasserkante during Hamburg Uprising. In 1924 he attended the military school in Moscow; in the same year he became leader of the newly founded Roter Frontkämpferbund (RFB) and editor in chief of its newspaper, the Rote Front. In 1927 he was dispatched to the 11th party congress of the KDP in Essen.

In the corruption scandal concerning Willy Leow (second chairman of the RFB), Schreiner took a critical position. Nicknamed the KDP-"Rechter" ("right wing"), he lost all functions in the RFB and was expelled from the KPD in 1929.  He joined the Communist Party of Germany (Opposition) (KPO) of Heinrich Brandler and August Thalheimer and worked at Gegen den Strom (Against the Flow), the theoretical newspaper of the KPO. He was also a member of the Berlin district leadership and the national leadership of the organisation. In October 1932 Schreiner unexpectedly quit the KPO and then rejoined after criticism from his local group. Brandler opposed his return.

In 1933 Schreiner emigrated to France and became a KPD member again. He was secretary of the Thälmann Committee and chief of staff of the XIII International Brigade during the Spanish Civil War. After their defeat in 1939, he fled to Morocco, where he was imprisoned. 
In 1941, on the way to Mexico, he was detained in the United States, where he remained until 1946. As in France, he wrote military and historical fiction. He was a founding member of the "German American Emergency Conference" in 1942 and of the "Council for a Democratic Germany" (CDG) in 1944.

At the end of 1946 he returned to Germany and enrolled in the recently formed SED. In 1947 he was appointed Professor of the University of Leipzig, where he was subsequently Dean of Social Sciences. Schreiner published various books. From 1950 he was Head of Department at the Marx-Engels-Lenin-Institute of the SED Central Committee. From 1950-1953 there was an SED campaign against former KPO members, implemented by the Zentrale Parteikontrollkommission. On account of his former membership, Schreiner was briefly proscribed. In 1952 he became head of the "1918–1945" department at the Museum for German History and in 1956 he became head of the "1918-1945" department at the Historical Institute of the German Academy of Sciences at Berlin. He retired in 1960.

Schreiner was awarded the National Prize of East Germany in 1952, the Order of Karl Marx in 1962, the Patriotic Order of Merit in 1967, the Patriotic Order of Merit with golden honour clasp in 1972 and the Star of People's Friendship in 1977.

Albert Schreiner and a small group of like-minded individuals sought to establish historical seminars and institutes in the DDR which conformed to the SED's regulations. The "Guild" of DDR Historians was not initially in the Marxist tradition. According to Lothar Mertens, Walter Bartel (like Horst Bartel, Karl Bittel, Rudolf Lindau und Walter Bartel) lacked the necessary skill and rigour to sufficiently distance his academic output from the category of "mere" party propaganda.

Writings 
22 publications, including

 Die deutsche Sozialdemokratie. Vierzehn Jahre im Bunde mit dem Kapital, Berlin, 1928 (with Paul Frölich)
 Hitler treibt zum Krieg, 1934, co-author, edited by Dorothy Woodman
 Hitlers Luftflotte startbereit!, 1935 edited by Dorothy Woodman
 Hitlers motorisierte Stoßarmee, 1936 under the pseudonym Albert Müller
 Vom totalen Krieg zur totalen Niederlage Hitlers A critique of the military ideology of the Third Reich. Paris 1939
 The Lesson of Germany. A Guide to her History. New York 1945 (with Albert Norden and Gerhart Eisler)
 Zur Geschichte der deutschen Aussenpolitik, 1871–1945. Bd 1. 1871–1918. Von der Reichseinigung bis zur Novemberrevolution. Berlin 1952
 Revolutionäre Ereignisse und Probleme in Deutschland während der Periode der Grossen Sozialistischen Oktoberrevolution 1917/1918. Beiträge zum 40. Jahrestag der Grossen Sozialistischen Oktoberrevolution. Berlin 1957

References

Bibliography 
 Theodor Bergmann. Gegen den Strom. Die Geschichte der KPD(-Opposition). Hamburg 2004. 
 Pierre Broué et al. Revolution in Allemagne (1917–1923). Paris 1971.
 Mario Keßler. "Hitler treibt zum Krieg. Albert Schreiner als Militärwissenschaftler im Exil." Jahrbuch für Forschungen zur Geschichte der Arbeiterbewegung. Part. II/2008.
 
 Ilko-Sascha Kowalczuk: "Schreiner, Albert." In Wer war wer in der DDR? 5th edition. Vol. 2, Berlin 2010, .
 Karl Hermann Tjaden: Struktur und Funktion der „KPD-Opposition“ (KPO). Meisenheim am Glan 1964.
 Hermann Weber: Die Wandlung des deutschen Kommunismus. Die Stalinisierung der KPD in der Weimarer Republik. Frankfurt am Main 1969, pp. 289 f.

External links 
 
 Albert Schreiner on the Professorenkatalog der Universität Leipzig.

Social Democratic Party of Germany politicians
Communist Party of Germany politicians
Communist Party of Germany (Opposition) politicians
Socialist Unity Party of Germany members
Recipients of the National Prize of East Germany
Political office-holders in Württemberg
Academic staff of Leipzig University
International Brigades personnel
Rotfrontkämpferbund members
Communists in the German Resistance
1892 births
1979 deaths
20th-century German historians
German Marxist historians